Driveria is an extinct genus of non-mammalian synapsids the Lower Permian of San Angelo Formation, Texas. It is mostly known from several postcranial bones, including the scapula, pelvis, and a few vertebrae and ribs, although a fragment of the skull that might pertain to the upper temporal fenestra is also associated with this species.

See also

 List of therapsids

References

 The main groups of non-mammalian synapsids at Mikko's Phylogeny Archive
 

Tapinocephalian genera
Cisuralian synapsids of North America
Fossil taxa described in 1962
Taxa named by Everett C. Olson
Cisuralian genus first appearances
Cisuralian genus extinctions